Ivan Eugene Bonar (October 31, 1924 – December 8, 1988) was an American character actor whose career in Hollywood, in films and television, spanned four decades, from the mid 1950s into the 1980s.

Life and career
A vaunted character actor, Bonar made appearances in many films, such as Night of the Quarter Moon (1959), Air Patrol and Womanhunt (1962), Gable and Lombard (1976), MacArthur (1977), where he played U.S. Army Lt. General Richard K. Sutherland, Same Time Next Year (1978, with Alan Alda and Ellen Burstyn) and the 1983 made-for-TV movie Rita Hayworth: The Love Goddess as Hollywood film director Howard Hawks.

Bonar is perhaps better known for his career in television, as he guest starred in episodes of many hit TV series such as The Adventures of Ozzie and Harriet, McHale's Navy, Perry Mason, Dennis the Menace, the ABC-TV version of My Three Sons,  I Dream of Jeannie, where he served as the voice of the announcer in one episode, The Partridge Family, and the NBC-TV series Ironside, amongst many other appearances which continued into the 1980s, on such shows as Dallas, Dynasty, and Hart to Hart. From 1966 to 1971, and then 1973 to 1979, he had a recurring role as Chase Murdock on the ABC-TV daytime soap opera series General Hospital. In 1973, he appeared in Hawkins: Death and the Maiden, a TV movie that served as the pilot for the series Hawkins starring James Stewart.

Death
Bonar died in 1988 in Los Angeles.

Filmography

External links

1924 births
1988 deaths
American male film actors
American male television actors
American male voice actors
Male actors from Iowa
20th-century American male actors